Group E of the women's football tournament at the 2016 Summer Olympics was played from 3 to 9 August 2016, and included hosts Brazil, China, South Africa and Sweden. The top two teams advanced to the knockout stage, while the third-placed team also advanced if they were among the two best third-placed teams among all three groups.

All times are BRT (UTC−3). For matches in Manaus, which is in AMT (UTC−4), local times are listed in parentheses.

Teams

Standings

Matches

Sweden vs South Africa

Brazil vs China PR

South Africa vs China PR

Brazil vs Sweden

South Africa vs Brazil

China PR vs Sweden

References

External links
Football – Women, Rio2016.com
Women's Olympic Football Tournament, Rio 2016, FIFA.com

Group E